Behala Purba Assembly constituency is a Legislative Assembly constituency of South 24 Parganas district in the Indian state of West Bengal.

Overview
As per orders of the Delimitation Commission, No. 153 Behala Purba Assembly constituency is composed of the following: Ward Nos. 115, 116, 117, 120, 121, 122, 123,  124, 142, 
143 and 144 
of Kolkata Municipal  Corporation.

Behala Purba Assembly constituency is part of No. 23 Kolkata Dakshin. Behala East was earlier part of Jadavpur.

Members of Legislative Assembly

Election results

2021

2016

2011
In 2011 Sovan Chatterjee of Trinamool Congress defeated his nearest rival Kumkum Chakraborty of CPI(M),

.# Swing calculated on Congress+Trinamool Congress vote percentages taken together in 2006.

1977–2006
In the 2006 state assembly elections, Kumkum Chakraborti of Communist Party of India (Marxist) won the Behala East assembly seat defeating her nearest rival Sovan Chatterjee of Trinamool Congress. Contests in most years were multi cornered but only winners and runners are being mentioned. Parash Dutta of Trinamool Congress defeated Kumkum Chakraborti of CPI(M) in 2001. Kumkum Chakraborti of CPI(M) defeated Sonali Guha of Congress in 1996, and Sailen Dasgupta of Congress in 1991. Niranjan Mukherjeee of CPI(M) defeated Debashis Bhattacharya of Congress in 1987, Balaram Goswami of Congress in 1982, and Indrajit Mazumdar of Congress in 1977.

1952–1972
Indrajit Majumdar of Congress won the Behala East seat in 1972. Niranjan Mukherjee of CPI(M) won in 1971, 1969 and 1967. Prior to that Behala was a single seat. Rabindra Nath Mukhopadhyay of CPI won the Behala seat in 1962 and 1957. In independent India's first election in 1952, Biren Roy of Forward Bloc (RG) won the Behala seat.

References

Notes

Citations

Assembly constituencies of West Bengal
Politics of South 24 Parganas district